The Battle of Rathmines was fought on 2 August 1649, near the modern Dublin suburb of Rathmines, during the Irish Confederate Wars, an associated conflict of 1638 to 1651 Wars of the Three Kingdoms. It has been described as the 'decisive battle of the Engagement in Ireland.'

In late July 1649, a combined Irish Confederate/Royalist army under the Earl of Ormond, tried to capture Dublin, held by forces loyal to the Commonwealth, commanded by Michael Jones. Despite their superior numbers, Ormond's troops were routed by Jones' veterans, many of whom were members of the New Model Army. Their victory secured Dublin, enabling another 12,000 troops under Oliver Cromwell to land unimpeded, and begin the Cromwellian conquest of Ireland.

Background

The Irish Rebellion of 1641 led to the establishment of the Catholic Confederation, based in Kilkenny, and the Irish Confederate Wars. From 1641 to 1643, the main struggle was between the Confederation and Irish and English Royalists, with what amounted to a separate war in Ulster. This featured Gaelic Catholic leader Eoghan Ó Néill, versus Presbyterian settlers, supported by a Scots Covenanter army under Robert Monro.

In September 1643, Charles I's commander in Ireland, the Duke of Ormond, agreed to a truce, or 'Cessation', with the Confederation. This freed his troops for use in the First English Civil War, and over 5,000 of these veterans were shipped to England.

Fighting continued in Ulster, while some Irish Royalists objected to the deal and defected to the Parliamentarians, including the Earl of Inchiquin. Others, such as Sir Charles Coote, and Michael Jones, son of the Bishop of Killaloe, joined Parliamentarian forces in England.

Despite his surrender in 1646, Charles continued secret negotiations with the Confederation for military support. Rather than see them capture Dublin, in June 1647 Ormond agreed to hand over the town to Jones, recently appointed by Parliament as the new governor. He went into exile, while Jones won a series of victories in Leinster, successfully preventing Irish intervention in the 1648 Second English Civil War.

Ormond returned to Ireland in October 1648; on arrival, he was met by Inchiquin, who changed sides once more, and on 17 January 1649, agreed an alliance with the Confederation to restore Charles to power. Ormond's Royalists comprised members of the Protestant Church of Ireland, English exiles, many of whom were Catholic, and a small number of Irish Catholics like Clanricarde. Most of the rank and file were locally recruited Protestants, with significant numbers of former English Royalists, many shipped to Ireland by Parliament to remove them as a threat.

After Charles was executed on 30 January, the Royalist-Confederation alliance was joined by Ulster Presbyterians; as in Scotland, the majority were Calvinists, who viewed monarchy as divinely ordained, making his execution by the Commonwealth sacrilegious. Ó Néill now agreed a separate truce with George Monck, Parliamentarian commander in Ulster; although London quickly disavowed this, it resulted in a split that fatally damaged the Confederation, and undermined their alliance with the Royalists.

Since troops were rarely paid and supplies scarce, their provision was an important factor, and control of the sea gave the Commonwealth a decisive advantage. Although religion generally took precedence, motives and loyalties were complex, and many of the parties fought one another at different times, in a war marked by atrocities on both sides. 2,000 to 3,000 Protestants died in the pursuit that followed Ó Néill's victory at Benburb in June 1646, with a similar number of Catholic casualties after Inchiquin's victory at Knocknanuss in December 1647.

Battle

Despite diverting vital resources trying to subdue Ó Néill, by the end of May the Alliance controlled most of Ireland. After capturing Drogheda and Dundalk in June, Ormond moved onto Dublin, seeking to prevent its use by an expeditionary force currently being assembled by Cromwell. He hoped for naval support from Prince Rupert's small Royalist squadron, but this was blockaded in Kinsale by the Commonwealth admiral Robert Blake.

Jones had less than 3,000 men facing an Allied army of over 11,000, although his were of much higher quality. On 22 July, Ormond arrived outside Dublin, and stationed his main force on the south bank of the River Liffey, with 2,500 men under Viscount Dillon investing the Northside. However, on 26 July, Jones received four regiments of reinforcements from Chester under Robert Venables, increasing his strength to 4,000 infantry, and 1,200 cavalry, the vast majority experienced veterans.

Combined with news Cromwell and another 9,000 were about to sail from Bristol, an Allied Council of War decided to speed up operations. On 28th, they captured Rathfarnham Castle, cutting Dublin's main water supply. Just after midnight on 2 August, Ormond sent 1,500 men under Major-General Patrick Purcell to occupy the partially demolished Baggotrath Castle, on the site of the present-day Baggot Street bridge; its possession would allow their artillery to fire on ships entering the harbour.

For reasons that are unclear, Purcell took several hours to reach Baggotrath, less than a mile away from the camp. Alerted by the noise, and understanding the intent, Jones drew up his troops on the far side, with the Liffey at his back. Ormond ordered Purcell to make the position defensible, left him some cavalry under Sir William Vaughan, and returned to camp to prepare the rest of his army for action.  

However, Jones immediately attacked, scattering Purcell's men, and killing Vaughan; by 10:00 am, the castle was back in his control. Ormond ordered his troops into battle formation, but Jones continued the assault, sending his cavalry around his flanks, and capturing the artillery train. Although his advance was briefly checked by a regiment under Colonel John Gifford, Ormond's left disintegrated without firing a shot, and by midday, the fighting was over. Dillon withdrew to Drogheda, his retreat covered by 1,000 cavalry under Sir Thomas Armstrong, an experienced Royalist officer.

Hundreds of Royalist and Confederate soldiers were cut down during the pursuit, while in addition to Vaughan, the Earl of Fingall was wounded and captured, dying in Dublin Castle a few days later. Ormond claimed to have lost between 600 and 1,000 men, 300 of whom were allegedly shot after surrendering; Jones reported minimal losses, in return for inflicting 4,000 casualties, including 2,517 prisoners. The consensus among historians is that while Jones' figures may be too high, they are probably closer to the real number of Allied losses.

Aftermath
One of the Royalist officers captured at Rathmines was Richard Elliott, son of Jones's sister Mary; the bitterness engendered by over eight years of brutal warfare was demonstrated by the execution of his nephew along with a number of other prisoners. Jones then displayed typical energy in immediately seeking to take advantage of his success by marching on Drogheda, but when the town refused to surrender he was forced to withdraw, having insufficient troops to storm it.

Victory allowed the Parliamentarian troops to create a defensive line covering the road between Dublin and the port of Ringsend, where Cromwell landed on 15 August, beginning the Cromwellian conquest of Ireland. Divided and demoralised, Protestant Royalists deserted in large numbers over the next few months, including Gifford; Ó Néill now agreed to join Ormonde, but negotiations were only completed shortly before he died in early November. His army played little part in the Parliamentarian campaign that reconquered Ulster from September to December and was destroyed by Sir Charles Coote at Scarrifholis the following year.

Several local landmarks are named after the battle; 'The Bleeding Horse' public house, on the corner of modern Upper Camden street, allegedly gained its name because its stables were used after the battle to treat injured horses. An area near Milltown was formerly known as the "Bloody Fields", where it is believed some of those killed in the pursuit were buried.

References

Sources
 
 
 
 

 
 
 
 
 
 
 
 
 

1649 in Ireland
Battles involving England
Battles involving Ireland
Battles of the Irish Confederate Wars
History of County Dublin
Military history of Ireland
Rathmines